Roscoe Holcomb, (born Roscoe Halcomb September 5, 1912 – died February 1, 1981) was an American singer, banjo player, and guitarist from Daisy, Kentucky.  A prominent figure in Appalachian folk music, Holcomb was the inspiration for the term "high, lonesome sound," coined by folklorist and friend John Cohen. The "high lonesome sound" term is now used to describe bluegrass singing, although Holcomb was not, strictly speaking, a bluegrass performer.

Performance style
Holcomb's repertoire included old-time music, hymns, traditional music and blues ballads. In addition to playing the banjo and guitar, he was a competent harmonica and fiddle player, and sang many of his most memorable songs a cappella. Holcomb stated "Up till then the blues were only inside me; Blind Lemon was the first to 'let out' the blues."

Holcomb sang in a nasal style informed by the Old Regular Baptist vocal tradition. Bob Dylan, a fan of Holcomb, described his singing as possessing "an untamed sense of control." He was also admired by the Stanley Brothers and Eric Clapton, who cited Holcomb as his favorite country musician.

Life and career 
A coal miner, construction laborer and farmer for much of his life, Holcomb was not recorded until 1958, after which his career as a professional musician was bolstered by the folk revival in the 1960s. Holcomb gave his last live performance in 1978. Due to what he described as injuries he sustained during his long career as a laborer, Holcomb was eventually unable to work for more than short periods, and his later income came primarily from his music. Suffering from asthma and emphysema as a result of working in coal mines, he died in a nursing home in 1981, at the age of 68.

Holcomb is buried at the Arch Halcomb Cemetery in Leatherwood, Kentucky. His tombstone bears his given name of Halcomb rather than Holcomb.

Discography
Holcomb's discography includes the following albums released on LP during his lifetime:
 The Music of Roscoe Holcomb and Wade Ward, Folkways Records, 1962
 The High Lonesome Sound, Folkways Records, 1965
 Close to Home, Folkways Records, 1975

The following single-artist compilations have been released since his death:
 The High Lonesome Sound, Smithsonian Folkways, 1998
 An Untamed Sense of Control, Smithsonian Folkways, 2003

Holcomb's work appears on many multiple-artist compilations, including the following released during his lifetime:
 Mountain Music of Kentucky, Folkways Records, 1960 (6 of 29 tracks)
 FOTM – Friends of Old Time Music, Folkways Records, 1964 (2 of 16 tracks)
 Zabriskie Point (Original Motion Picture Soundtrack), MGM Records, 1970 (1 of 11 tracks)
 3rd Annual Brandywine Mountain Music Convention – '76 Music of Kentucky, Heritage Records [Virginia], 1977 (2 of 14 tracks)

References

External links
Short biography from CMT.com

Review and short biography by Tom Netherland
John Cohen's documentary 'The High Lonesome Sound'
Television appearance on Pete Seeger's Rainbow Quest

1912 births
1981 deaths
American country guitarists
American folk guitarists
American male guitarists
American country singer-songwriters
American folk singers
American banjoists
American country banjoists
Old-time musicians
People from Perry County, Kentucky
Musicians from Appalachia
20th-century American singers
Folk musicians from Kentucky
Country musicians from Kentucky
Singer-songwriters from Kentucky
Bluegrass musicians from Kentucky
20th-century American guitarists
Guitarists from Kentucky
20th-century American male musicians
American male singer-songwriters